8/3 may refer to:
August 3 (month-day date notation)
March 8 (day-month date notation)
The octagram